The NAIDOC Awards are annual Australian awards conferred on Australian Aboriginal and Torres Strait Islander individuals during the national celebration of the history, culture and achievements of Australian Aboriginal and Torres Strait Islander peoples known as NAIDOC Week. (The name is derived from National Aborigines and Islanders Day Observance Committee.)

The committee
The awards are named after the committee that was originally responsible for organising the national activities to mark NAIDOC Week, the National Aborigines and Islanders Day Observance Committee. Each year, a different city hosts the National NAIDOC Awards Ceremony. The host city, National NAIDOC Poster Competition and the NAIDOC Awards recipients are selected by the National NAIDOC Committee. The awards are presented at the annual NAIDOC Awards Ceremony and Ball.

Categories
The names of the categories have varied over time. In 1985 Awards for Aboriginal of the Year, and for Aboriginal young people aged 12 to 25 were introduced.

 the categories comprise:

 Person of the Year 
 Lifetime Achievement Award 
 Female Elder Award 
 Male Elder Award 
 Sportsperson Award 
 Youth Award 
 Creative Talent Award 
 Caring for Country and Culture Award 
 Education Award 
 Innovation Award

Poster
The first NAIDOC poster was created in 1972 to promote "Aborigines Day", which had been established as part of a campaign for better rights for Aboriginal people. The posters continued to reflect the spirit of protest until 1977, with titles like "Self Determination" and "Chains or Chance". The 1978 poster was different, reflecting the move from a single day of demonstration to a celebration lasting a week each July, after the new committee was established. The 1988 poster, "Recognise and Share the Survival of the Oldest Culture in the World" reflected the name change to NAIDOC,  which formally included Torres Strait Islander people in the event. In the 1990s a competition to design the poster was introduced.

Winners 2021–2030

2022 winners 
The awards ceremony was held in Melbourne on 2 July 2022. The winners are:
 Person of the Year — Ash Barty 
 Lifetime Achievement Award – Stan Grant Snr 
 Female Elder Award – Lois Peeler 
 Male Elder Award – Uncle Jack Charles
 Sportsperson Award – Buddy Franklin
 Youth Award – Elijah Manis
 Creative Talent Award – Lowell Hunter
 Caring for Country and Culture Award – Walter Jackson
 Education Award – Bronwyn Fredericks
 Innovation Award – The Koori Mail team and volunteers, for their "coordination and leadership" of relief efforts after the record-breaking March 2022 floods in Lismore

2021 winners
The 2021 National NAIDOC Awards ceremony in Alice Springs (Mparntwe) was cancelled. An alternative NAIDOC Awards event was planned for 3 July 2021 at the Sydney Opera House, but was postponed. As Sydney went into a COVID-19 lockdown on 23 June, rules for travellers returning to the Northern Territory meant that most people could not attend the Sydney event without a 14-day quarantine. The award-winners were announced on 1 December 2021. The winners are:
 Lifetime Achievement Award – Pat O'Shane 
 Person of the Year – Keri Tamwoy
 Female Elder of the Year – Christobel Swan
 Male Elder of the Year – Ernest Hoolihan
 Caring for Country – Gadrian Hoosan on behalf of the Borroloola Community
 Youth of the Year – Samara Fernandez-Brown
 Artist of the Year – Bobbi Lockyer
 Scholar of the Year – Sasha Purcell
 Apprentice of the Year – Jarron Andy
 Sportsperson of the Year – Clarence "CJ" McCarthy-Grogan

Winners 2011–2020

2020 winners

 Due to the impact and uncertainty of the COVID-19 pandemic in Australia the National NAIDOC Committee cancelled the 2020 National NAIDOC Awards. The National Indigenous Australians Agency announced the 2020 awards would be presented in July 2021 with the 2021 awards.

2019 winners
 Sportsperson of the Year - Shantelle Thompson
 Female Elder of the Year - Thelma Weston
 Male Elder of the Year - Greg Little
 Person of the Year - Dean Duncan
 Artist of the Year - Elma Gada Kris
 Youth of the Year - Mi-kaisha Masella
 Lifetime achievement award - David Gulpilil Ridjimiraril Dalaithngu
 Caring for Country - Littlewell Working Group
 Scholar of the Year - Professor Michael McDaniel
 Apprentice of the Year - Ganur Maynard

2018 winners
 Sportsperson of the Year - Jack Peris
 Female Elder of the Year - Lynette Nixon
 Male Elder of the Year - Russell Charles Taylor AM
 Person of the Year - Dr June Oscar AO
 Artist of the Year - Adam Briggs "Briggs"
 Youth of the Year - Tamina Pitt
 Lifetime achievement award - Patricia Anderson AO
 Caring for Country - Mungalla Aboriginal Business Corporation in North Queensland
 Scholar of the Year - Professor Michelle Trudgett
 Apprentice of the Year - Folau Talbot

2017 winners
 Sportsperson of the Year - Amanda Reid
 Female Elder of the Year - Faye Carr
 Male Elder of the Year - Alex "Ollie" George
 Person of the Year - Patrick "Patty" Mills
 Artist of the Year - Elverina Johnson
 Youth of the Year - Latia Schefe
 Lifetime achievement award - Dianne Ryder
 Caring for Country - Minjerribah Moorgumpin Elders-in-Council Aboriginal Corporation (QLD)
 Scholar of the Year - Dr James Charles
 Apprentice of the Year - Sharee Yamashita

2016 winners
 Sportsperson of the Year – Jade North
 Female Elder of the Year – MaryAnn Bin-Sallik
 Male Elder of the Year – Robert Francis Isaacs
 Person of the Year – Goreng Goreng man Professor Chris Sarra
 Artist of the Year – Geoffrey Gurrumul Yunupingu
 Youth of the Year – Elijah Douglas
 Lifetime achievement award – Stephen Page
 Caring for Country – Manymak Energy Efficiency Project (NT)
 Scholar of the Year – Layneisha Sgro
 Apprentice of the Year – Montana Ah-Won

2015 winners
 Youth of the Year – Chris Tamwoy
 Apprentice of the Year – Ashley Farrall
 Artist of the Year – Daren Dunn
 Poster competition winner – Elaine Chambers
 Caring for Country – Warddeken Caring for Country Project
 Female Elder of the Year – Veronica Perrule Dobson
 Male Elder of the Year – Graham Taylor
 Lifetime Achievement Award – Tauto Sansbury
 Person of the Year – Rosalie Kunoth-Monks
 Scholar of the Year – Michelle Deshong
 Sportsperson of the Year – Ryan Morich

2014 winners
 Youth of the Year – Chern’ee Sutton
 Youth of the Year – Amelia Telford
 Apprentice of the Year – Patricia Doolan
 Artist of the Year – Shellie Morris
 Poster competition winner – Harry Alfred Pitt
 Caring for Country – The Uunguu Healthy Country Project
 Lifetime Achievement Award – Linda Burney
 Person of the Year – Gracelyn Smallwood
 Female Elder of the Year – Patricia O'Connor
 Male Elder of the Year – Richard Archibald
 Scholar of the Year – Donisha Duff
 Sportsperson of the Year – Jesse Williams

2013 winners
 Youth of the Year – Kate Malpass
 Apprentice of the Year – Danny Bromot
 Artist of the Year – Tony Briggs
 Poster competition winner – Gail Naden
 Caring for Country – Jimmy Edgar
 Lifetime Achievement Award – Galarrwuy Yunupingu
 Person of the Year – Darryl Kickett
 Female Elder of the Year – Rose Richards
 Male Elder of the Year – John Hayden
 Scholar of the Year – Dr Mark McMillan
 Sportsperson of the Year – Jonathan Thurston

2012 winners
 Youth of the Year – Benson Saulo
 Apprentice of the Year – Michael Clinch
 Artist of the Year – Stephen Page
 Poster competition winner – Juundaal Strang-Yettica
 Caring for Country – Bunya Bunya Country Aboriginal Corporation
 Lifetime Achievement Award – Bunna Lawrie
 Person of the Year – David Wirrpanda
 Female Elder of the Year – Margaret Lawton
 Female Elder of the Year – Maureen Kelly
 Male Elder of the Year – Hezekiel Jingoonya
 Scholar of the Year – Sarah Bourke
 Sportsperson of the Year – Vanessa Wilson
 Sportsperson of the Year – Joshua Robinson
 Torres Strait Artist of the Year – Alick Tipoti

2011 winners
 Youth of the Year – Kiel Williams-Weigel
 Apprentice of the Year – Joshua Toomey
 Artist of the Year – Robyn Djunginy
 Poster competition winner – Matthew Humphries
 Lifetime Achievement Award – Ned Cheedy
 Caring for Country – Warru Recovery Team
 Person of the Year – Terri Janke
 Female Elder of the Year – Carolyn Briggs
 Male Elder of the Year – Eldridge Mosby
 Scholar of the Year – Professor Lester-Irabinna Rigney
 Sportsperson of the Year – Preston Campbell

Winners 2001–2010

2010 winners
 Youth of the Year – Jessica Smith
 Apprentice of the Year – Lucas Kickett
 Artist of the Year – Lewis Langton
 Poster competition winner – Sheree Blackley
 Caring for Country – Crazy Ant Management Program
 Lifetime Achievement Award – Vince Coulthard
 Person of the Year – Dennis Eggington
 Female Elder of the Year – Ali Golding
 Male Elder of the Year – Ali Drummond
 Male Elder of the Year – Lester Bostock
 Scholar of the Year – Megan Davis
 Sportsperson of the Year – Rohanee Cox

2009 winners
 Youth of the Year – Gemma Benn
 Apprentice of the Year – Danny Sebasio
 Artist of the Year – Wayne Quilliam
 Poster competition winner – Luke Mallie
 Lifetime Achievement Award – Lowitja O'Donoghue
 Person of the Year – Larissa Behrendt
 Male Elder of the Year – Reg Knox
 Male Elder of the Year – Frank Lampard
 Female Elder of the Year – Elsie Heiss
 Female Elder of the Year – Doris Eaton
 Scholar of the Year – Dr Chelsea Bond
 Sportsperson of the Year – Andrew McLeod

2009 winners
 Torres Strait Senior Cultural Award – Alick Tipoti

2008 winners
 Youth of the Year – Krista Moir
 Youth of the Year – Angeline Blackburn
 Apprentice of the Year – Amy McQuire
 Artist of the Year – Les Elvin
 Poster competition winner – Duwun (Tony) Lee and Laniyuk (Ian) Lee
 Lifetime Achievement Award – Archie Roach
 Lifetime Achievement Award – Joseph Elu
 Lifetime Achievement Award – Chicka Dixon
 Person of the Year – Colleen Hayward
 Male Elder of the Year – Bob Muir
 Female Elder of the Year – Carol Petterson
 Scholar of the Year – Dr Karen Martin
 Sportsperson of the Year – Stacey Porter

2007 winners
 Youth of the Year – Simone Liddy
 Apprentice of the Year – Hamid Bin Saad
 Artist of the Year – Leah Purcell
 Poster competition winner – Tyeli Hannah
 Lifetime Achievement Award – John (Jak) Ah Kit
 Person of the Year – Mark Bin Bakar
 Female Elder of the Year – Dr Ruby Langford Ginibi
 Male Elder of the Year – Boyd Scully
 Male Elder of the Year – Jim Hagan (Snr)
 Scholar of the Year – Dr Yin Carl Paradies
 Sportsperson of the Year – Robert Crowther

2006 winners
 Youth of the Year – Jo-Anne D'Cress
 Artist of the Year – Warren H. Williams
 Poster competition winner – Charmaine Green
 Lifetime Achievement Award – Elizabeth Morgan Hoffman
 Person of the Year – Stephen Hagan (Jnr)
 Female Elder of the Year – Judy Tatow
 Male Elder of the Year – Vince Ross
 Scholar of the Year – Dr Chris Sara
 Sportsperson of the Year – Patrick Mills

2005 winners
 Youth of the Year – Joleen Ryan
 Artist of the Year – Kerrianne Cox
 Poster competition winner – Benjamin Hodges
 Lifetime Achievement Award – Arthur Murray
 Person of the Year – Cheryl Buchanan
 Person of the Year – Rodney Dillon
 Female Elder of the Year – Mary Jane Ware
 Male Elder of the Year – Albert Holt
 Scholar of the Year – Simon Forrest
 Sportsperson of the Year – Pam Pedersen

2004 winners
 Youth of the Year – Michael Hayden
 Artist of the Year – Jirra Lulla Harvey
 Poster competition winner – Jirra Lulla Harvey
 Person of the Year – Aden Ridgeway
 Elder of the Year – Merlene Mead
 Male Elder of the Year – Steve Mam
 Scholar of the Year – Kaye Price
 Sportsperson of the Year – Adam Goodes

2003 winners
 Youth of the Year – Stacey Kelly-Greenup
 Artist of the Year – Belynda Waugh
 Poster competition winner – Belynda Waugh
 Person of the Year – Deborah Mailman
 Female Elder of the Year – Violet French
 Male Elder of the Year – William Kennedy
 Scholar of the Year – Frederick Penny
 Sportsperson of the Year – David Peachey

2002 winners
 Youth of the Year – Bruce 'Borro' Johnson
 Apprentice/Trainee of the Year – Michelle Tyhuis
 Poster competition winner – Juundaal Strang-Yettica
 Person of the Year – Steve Gordon
 Male Elder of the Year – Lyal Munro Snr and Peter Coppin (Joint winners)
 Female Elder of the Year – Ida West
 Scholar of the Year – Tracey Westerman
 Sportsperson of the Year – Bo Delacruz
 Special Achievement Award – Dr Shane Fernando

2001 winners
 Youth of the Year – Vanessa Elliot
 Apprentice/Trainee of the Year – Todd Phillips
 Poster competition winner – Marika Baumgart
 Person of the Year – Kutcha Edwards
 Female Elder of the Year – Alice 'Mummy' Clark
 Male Elder of the Year – Cec Fisher
 Scholar of the Year – Dr Cheryl Kickett-Tucker
 Sportsperson of the Year – Warren Lawton

Winners 1991–2000

2000 winners
 Youth of the Year – Marie Dennis
 Apprentice/Trainee of the Year – Alison Gear
 Artist of the Year – Jimmy Wavehill
 Poster competition winner – Cecily Wellington
 Person of the Year – Anthony Mundine
 Female Elder of the Year – Yvonne Agius
 Male Elder of the Year – James Rice
 Scholar of the Year – Marlina Whop
 Sportsperson of the Year – Troy Murphy

1999 winners
 Youth of the Year – Samantha Cook and Jeremy Geia (Joint winners)
 Apprentice/Trainee of the Year – Gary Bonney
 Artist of the Year – Wenten Rubuntja
 Poster Competition Winner – Warick Keen
 Person of the Year – Bob Randall
 Male Elder of the Year – Geoff Shaw
 Female Elder of the Year – Zona Martin
 Scholar of the Year – Tracey Brand
 Sportsperson of the Year – Nicky Winmar
 Torres Strait Senior Cultural Award – Alick Tipoti

1998 winners
 Youth of the Year – Nicole Casser and Delson Stokes Jnr (Joint winners)
 Apprentice/Trainee of the Year – June Djaigween
 Artist of the Year – Raymond Blanco
 Poster Competition Winner – Ray Thomas
 Person of the Year – Pat Dodson and Mick Dodson (Joint winners)
 Male Elder of the Year – George Mye
 Female Elder of the Year – Queenie McKenzie
 Scholar of the Year – Raymond (Jack) Gibson
 Sportsperson of the Year – Ali Drummond

1997 winners
 Youth of the Year – Kyle Morrison
 Apprentice/Trainee of the Year – Kasey Wehrman
 Artist of the Year – Ron Corbett
 Poster Competition Winner – Eleanor Binge
 Person of the Year – Ray Robinson
 Male Elder of the Year – Eric Walker
 Female Elder of the Year – Una Walker
 Scholar of the Year – John Williams Mozeley
 Sportsperson of the Year – Kasey Wehrman
 Miss NAIDOC – Vicky Hextall

1996 winners
 Youth of the Year – Yvonne Marika
 Apprentice/Trainee of the Year – Jade Johnson
 Artist of the Year – Jonathon Brown
 Poster Competition Winner –
 Aboriginal and Torres Strait Islander of the Year – Tauto Sansbury
 Elder of the Year – Freda Winmar
 Scholar of the Year – Jill Abdulla
 Aboriginal Sportsperson of the Year – Derek Kickett
 Miss National NAIDOC –  Nevanka McKeon

1995 winners
 Youth of the Year – Timothy Lilley
 Apprentice of the Year – Robert Hudson
 Poster competition winner – Ian Wallan Hill
 Aboriginal of the Year – Reg Blow
 Artist of the Year – Richard Mullet
 Scholar of the Year – Graham Atkinson
 Sportsperson of the Year – Rohan Best

1994 winners
 Youth of the Year – Vanessa Fitzgerald
 Apprentice/Trainee of the Year – Darren Braydon
 Artist of the Year – Rex Murray
 Poster Competition Winner – Dale Huddleston and Scott Towney
 Person of the Year – Ernie Dingo
 Scholar of the Year – Rosie Smith
 Sportsperson of the Year – Kyle Vander Kuyp

1993 winners
 Aboriginal of the Year – Charles Perkins
 Scholar of the Year – Glenda Kickett

1992 winners
 Youth of the Year – Shane Simpson
 Apprentice of the Year – David Pidek
 Artist of the Year – Danny Eastwood and John Harding (joint winners)
 Poster Competition Winner – Heather Shearer
 Aboriginal of the Year – Mrs Geraldine Briggs
 Scholar of the Year – Natalie Barney
 Sportsperson of the Year – Robert Peden

1991 winners
 Aboriginal of the Year – David Wowaljarlai
 Junior Award – Les Ritchie-Corlett
 Poster Competition Winner – Ron Hurley

Winners 1985–1990

1990 winners
 Aboriginal of the Year – Shirley Smith (Mum Shirl)

1989 winners
 Aboriginal of the Year – Jimmy Little

1988 winners
 Youth of the Year – Cain Muir
 Apprentice of the Year – Shaun Thompson
 Artist of the Year – Ramingining Artists Community
 Poster Competition Winner –
 Aboriginal of the Year – Alice Kelly
 Scholar of the Year – Ron James
 Sportsperson of the Year – Tony Currie

1987 winners
 Youth of the Year – Ron Ingram
 Apprentice of the Year – Alanna Speedy
 Artist of the Year – Jack Wunuwun
 Poster Competition Winner – Lawrie Nilsen
 Aboriginal of the Year – Sister Joan Winch
 Aboriginal Scholar of the Year – Norma Joshua
 Aboriginal Sportsperson of the Year – Catherine Hillard

1986 winners
 Apprentice of the Year – Thomas Wear
 Artist of the Year – James Agius
 Poster Competition Winner –
 Aboriginal of the Year – Kathy Mills
 Scholar of the Year – Eve Fesl
 Sportswoman of the Year – Phynea Clarke
 Sportsman of the Year – Warren Lawton

1985 winners
 Apprentice of the Year – Lester Rigney
 Artist of the Year – Justine Saunders
 Poster Competition Winner –
 Aboriginal of the Year – Kath Walker
 Scholar of the Year – Rhonda Dadleh
 Sportsperson of the Year – Kyle Vander Kuyp

See also
 Deadly Awards
 NAIDOC Week

References

External link

Annual events in Australia
Australian Aboriginal culture
Torres Strait Islands culture
Australian awards